The Kinzl Crests are three peaks,  high, on Pernik Peninsula, Loubet Coast in Graham Land, Antarctica, standing  east of Salmon Cove and Lallemand Fjord. They were mapped from air photos taken by the Falkland Islands and Dependencies Aerial Survey Expedition, 1956–57, and were named by the UK Antarctic Place-Names Committee for Hans Kinzl, an Austrian glaciologist.

References

 SCAR Composite Gazetteer of Antarctica.

Ridges of Graham Land
Loubet Coast